Dowlatabad (also Romanized as Dowlatābād; also known as Daulatābād) is a village in Sabzdasht Rural District, in the Central District of Bafq County, Yazd Province, Iran. At the 2006 census, its population was 271, in 52 families.

References 

Populated places in Bafq County